Çakmakkaya can refer to:

 Çakmakkaya, Alacakaya
 Çakmakkaya mine